Tarsiger is a genus of six species of birds in the family Muscicapidae. They are small, mostly brightly coloured insectivorous birds native to Asia and (one species) northeastern Europe; four of the six species are confined to the Sino-Himalayan mountain system. The genus has sometimes been included within the related genus Luscinia, but the species have been found to form a distinct monophyletic group.

Taxonomy
The genus Tarsiger was introduced in 1845 by the English naturalist Brian Houghton Hodgson with the golden bush robin as the type species. The genus name is from Ancient Greek tarsos, "flat of the foot" and Latin gerere, "to carry".

The genus contains the following species:
White-browed bush robin (Tarsiger indicus)
Rufous-breasted bush robin (Tarsiger hyperythrus)
Collared bush robin (Tarsiger johnstoniae)
Red-flanked bluetail (Tarsiger cyanurus)
Himalayan bluetail (Tarsiger rufilatus)
Golden bush robin (Tarsiger chrysaeus)

The Himalayan bluetail was formerly treated as a subspecies of the red-flanked bluetail. It was split on the basis of its more intense plumage colours, and its ecology and behaviour, being a short-distance altitudinal migrant not a long-distance migrant.

The phylogenetic relationships between the species were determined in a molecular phylogenetic study published in 2022:

References

 
Bird genera
 
Taxonomy articles created by Polbot